The Botswana International is an open badminton tournament held in Gaborone, Botswana. The tournament has been an International Series level, except in 2012 and 2021 categorized as Future Series level from Badminton World Federation.

Previous winners 

 BWF International Challenge tournament
 BWF International Series tournament
 BWF Future Series tournament

Performances by nation

References 

Badminton tournaments in Botswana
Sports competitions in Botswana